Vaniusha The Newcomer is a 1990 Soviet Russian stop-motion animation film by Vladimir Danilevich and Olga Panokina. It was produced by Soyuzmultfilm studio. The film is about The Friendly Newcomer from another planet. It is the second film of the tetralogy, which tells about the adventures of The Newcomer Vaniusha and his friends. The other three films are The Newcomer in The Cabbage, Vaniusha and The Space Pirate and Vaniusha and The Giant.

Plot summary
The Cold Russian Winter.Vaniusha with His Friends make The Snow Sculpture. The winter ends. The Spring begins. The Snow Sculpture can melt. Vaniusha and His Friends decide to save The Snow Sculpture. They go in The Deep Space. They leave The Sculpture in The World, where The Sun was extinguished, and always cold.

This film has elements of folk tales and science fiction genres.

Creators

See also
"The Newcomer in The Cabbage"
"Vaniusha and The Space Pirate" 
"Vaniusha and The Giant"

External links
Vaniusha The Newcomer at Animator.ru
The Film at The Russian Movie base (rus) at Kinopoisk.ru

1990 animated films
1990 films
Russian animated films
Soyuzmultfilm
Soviet animated films
Russian and Soviet animated science fiction films